Muhammad Ameer Bhatti (born 8 March 1962) who has been serving as the Chief Justice of Lahore High Court since July 2021. He has been Justice of the Lahore High Court since 12 May 2011.

References

1962 births
Living people
Judges of the Lahore High Court
Pakistani judges